Athetis maculatra is a species of moth of the family Noctuidae. It is found in Australia (New South Wales, the Northern Territory, Queensland and Western Australia).

The wingspan is about 25 mm. The forewings  are speckled pale brown with a dark brown mark near the middle of the margin.

References

Moths described in 1902
Acronictinae
Moths of Australia